"Walk Em Down" is a song by American rapper NLE Choppa featuring American rapper Roddy Ricch. It was released on March 19, 2020, by Warner Records as the third single from NLE Choppa's debut studio album Top Shotta.

Background
NLE Choppa talked about the track in an interview with Complex. He said that he linked up with Roddy Ricch through Instagram’s DMs.

Composition and lyrics
On the song, Choppa, who usually has a "wild and rambunctious" delivery, employs his verses with more "reserve". Complex magazine's Jessica McKinney noted the "lyrical message is similar to Choppa's past songs, but the delivery is more melodic and smooth". McKinney attributed this too featured artist Roddy Ricch, who "may have served as some inspiration behind NLE's switch-up".

Critical reception
Billboard named the song one of the most essential releases of the week, calling it a "menacing anthem". The song has inspired the #WalkEmDownChallenge on video-sharing app TikTok.

Music video
The music video was released on March 19, 2020, along with the release of the single.

Charts

Weekly charts

Year-end charts

Certifications

References

2020 songs
2020 singles
NLE Choppa songs
Roddy Ricch songs
Songs written by Roddy Ricch
Songs written by CashMoneyAP
Songs written by NLE Choppa